This is a list of museums in Madagascar.

List 
 Ambatolampy
 Butterfly museum (Madagascar) (Le Musée des Papillons)
 Antananarivo
 Andafiavaratra Palace Museum
 Immaculate Conception Cathedral, Antananarivo Museum
 Museum of Ethnology and Paleontology
 Museum of Art and Archaeology
 National Museum of Geology
 Private Pirate’s Museum
 Vazimba Museum of the commune of Alasora
 Private Museum of Lohavohitra
 Museum of Photography of Madagascar
 Museum of the Armed Forces (Musée des Forces Armées)
 Antsirabe
 Akamia Museum
 Nosy Be
 Oceanographic Research Museum (CNRO)
 Fianarantsoa
 Musée Faniahy of the University of Fianarantsoa
 Floating Museum of the Canal des Pangalanes
 Toamasina
 CEREL Museum of the University of Toamasina
 Museum of the Port of Toamasina
 Moramanga
 Musée National de la Gendarmerie
 Andasibe Museum
 Fenoarivo Atsinanana
 LAMPY Museum of the commune of Fenoarivo Atsinanana
 Mahajanga
 Mozea Akiba of the University of Mahajanga 
Mandritsara
Androna museum, of the University of Mahajanga in Mandritsara
Île Sainte-Marie
Ilot Madame Museum
 Toliara
 CEDRATOM Museum of the University of Toliara
Rabesandratana Museum - an oceanographic & marine museum

 Tolanaro
 Anosy museum and Flacourt fortress
 Private Museum Arembelo Androy Berenty
 Andohahela Museum

See also 
 List of museums

References

External links 
 Museums in Madagascar
 
 

 
Madagascar
Museums
Museums
Museums
Madagascar